Kristoffer Zetterstrand (born 27 September 1973 in Stockholm, Sweden) is a Swedish surreal artist.

Education and work
Kristoffer Zetterstrand studied at Royal University College of Fine Arts in Stockholm and the Facultad de Bellas Artes in Madrid. Zetterstrand's works are influenced by both classical and Renaissance artwork, as well as computer graphics and 3D modeling. His debut exhibition in 2002 consisted of compilations for the game Counter-Strike. In 2010, Markus Persson added some of Zetterstrand's paintings in his flagship title, Minecraft, a sandbox and survival simulator based on Infiniminer, and ever since then the paintings have become an iconic part of the game. His paintings are often based on virtual still lifes and scenography sculpted in 3D applications, and he has broadened his sources of images to include vintage photography and imagery.

Awards
In 2008 Zetterstrand received the IASPIS artist in residency grant. In 2012 he received the Marianne & Sigvard Bernadotte Art Award. In 2013 he was awarded the Stora Kakelpriset, an annual prize for the most innovative use of tiles or ceramics in construction in Sweden, for his mosaic Ager Medicinae (The Medical Landscape). It depicts a rough timeline of the development of medicine in pixellated style.

References

Further information
 
 
  (video, 1:06:50)

External links

Artist's web site
Stene Projects gallery

1973 births
Living people
Swedish people of Canadian descent
Swedish people of English descent
Swedish people of Norwegian descent
20th-century Swedish painters
Swedish male painters
21st-century Swedish painters
20th-century Swedish male artists
21st-century Swedish male artists